Richard Noble may refer to:

 Richard Noble (born 1946) is a Scottish entrepreneur and former holder of the land speed record.
 Dick Noble (1915–1977), Australian rules footballer